The 2022 Men's Euro Hockey League Ranking Cup is the second edition of the Men's Euro Hockey League Ranking Cup, a secondary competition to Europe's premier club field hockey tournament, the Euro Hockey League. The tournament, organized by the European Hockey Federation, will be held in Terrassa, Spain, from 15 to 18 April 2022.

Format
As a secondary tournament to the Euro Hockey League, the Ranking Cup was created to determine the placings of the lower ranked teams for the 2020–21 EHL Season. 

The tournament comprises 8 teams, competing in a knockout format. The victorious teams from the knockout matches advance to the thirteenth to sixteenth place playoffs, while the losing teams contested ranking matches to determine seventeenth to twentieth places.

Results

Bracket

Quarter-finals

Fifth to eighth place classification

5–8th place semi-finals

Seventh place game

5th place game

First to fourth place classification

Semi-finals

Third place game

Final

Awards

Statistics

Final standings

Top Goalscorers

References

External links

Men's Euro Hockey League Ranking Cup
2021–22 in European field hockey
April 2022 sports events in Spain
2022 Euro Hockey League
2022 Euro Hockey League
2022 in Spanish sport